The Church of Our Lady of Perpetual Help and St. Alphonsus, popularly known as Iglesia de Tapes (due to its location on the Tapes Street, in the neighbourhood of Bella Vista) is a Roman Catholic parish church in Montevideo, Uruguay.

History
The temple was built between 1896 and 1899 in Neo-Romanesque style, inspired by a German church from Aachen.

The temple is dedicated to Our Lady of Perpetual Help and saint Alphonsus.

Inside there is a wonderful Walcker organ from 1927.

The parish was established on 17 November 1955.

At this church took place the wedding of Juana de Ibarbourou, the most famous Uruguayan poetess, in 1921.

References

External links
  

1955 establishments in Uruguay
Roman Catholic churches completed in 1899
Roman Catholic church buildings in Montevideo
Romanesque Revival church buildings in Uruguay
19th-century Roman Catholic church buildings in Uruguay